The Air Force Flight Test Museum is an aviation museum located at Edwards Air Force Base near Rosamond, California focused on the history of the Air Force Flight Test Center.

History 
The Flight Test Museum Foundation was founded in 1983 by Carol Odgers, Chuck Yeager, Robert Cardenas, and William J. Knight. A 335-acre site on Rosamond Boulevard was given to the foundation in 1984 to build a museum, but construction was delayed for many years. In the intervening time, the museum moved forward with the creation of the Blackbird Airpark at Air Force Plant 42 in 1991 and began collaborating with a group of amateur archaeologists to display pieces of wreckage of crashed x-planes recovered from the desert.

By 1997, the museum had raised enough money to begin construction on a new  building, which was fitted out in 1999 and opened in July 2000. Further efforts led to the opening of a Century Circle outside the west gate in August 2007 made up of six Century Series airplanes and the top of the former Edwards Air Force Base control tower. The museum's longtime chief historian, Dr. Jim Young, retired in 2011.

Efforts to move aircraft to better storage conditions began in March 2012, when the museum cleaned up its storage yard. This was followed by a number of significant moves in 2013, with the restoration shop being relocated to a new hangar with better equipment in February, three aircraft being towed to the museum grounds in August, and a VH-34 being transferred to a museum in Texas in September.

After its closure in 2015, an XB-47 was acquired from the Octave Chanute Aerospace Museum.

The museum broke ground on a new location outside the gate to the base in March 2018. Following site preparation, the first concrete was poured in June 2020.

Collection

Aircraft 

 Accurate Automation LoFLYTE
 Beech UC-45J Expeditor 67161
 Bell P-59A Airacomet 44-22633
 Bell X-1 – Replica
 Bensen X-25B 68-10771
 Boeing NC-135A Stratolifter 60-0377
 Boeing C-135C Stratolifter 61-2669 "Speckled Trout"
 Boeing NB-52B Stratofortress 52-0008
 Boeing Phantom Eye
 Boeing XB-47 Stratojet 46-0066
 Boeing X-48C
 Cessna NA-37B Dragonfly 73-1090
 Convair F-106B Delta Dart 59-0158
 Convair TF-102A Delta Dagger 54-1353
 Convair YB-58A Hustler 55-665
 de Havilland Canada C-7B Caribou 63-9765
 Douglas A3D-1 Skywarrior 135434
 Douglas C-53D Skytrooper 41-20093
 Douglas F-10B Skyknight 125850
 Douglas TB-26B Invader 44-34165
 Fairchild T-46A 84-0492
 Fairchild Republic YA-10B Thunderbolt II 73-1664
 General Dynamics F-16B Fighting Falcon 75-0751
 General Dynamics F-16B Fighting Falcon 80-0634
 General Dynamics F-16XL 75-0747
 General Dynamics F-16XL 75–0749
 General Dynamics F-111A Aardvark 63-9766
 General Dynamics NF-111A Aardvark 63-9778
 Gloster Meteor TT.20 WD592
 Grumman X-29 82-0049
 Grumman Gulfstream II Shuttle Training Aircraft
 Lockheed A-12 60-6924
 Lockheed C-130E Hercules 61-2358
 Lockheed C-140A JetStar 59-5962
 Lockheed D-21B
 Lockheed EF-80A Shooting Star 44-85123
 Lockheed F-104A Starfighter 56-801
 Lockheed NC-141A Starlifter 61-2779
 Lockheed NF-104A Starfighter 56-756
 Lockheed NF-104A Starfighter 56-790
 Lockheed SR-71A Blackbird 61-7955
 Lockheed SR-71A Blackbird 61-7973 – On loan
 Lockheed T-33A 52-9846
 Lockheed T-33A 58-0669
 Lockheed U-2D 56-6721
 Lockheed YF-22 87-0700
 Lockheed YF-94A Starfire 48-356
 Lockheed YF-117A Nighthawk 79-10783
 LTV YA-7D Corsair II 67-14583
 LTV YA-7F 71-0344
 Martin RB-57B Canberra 52-1576
 Martin Marietta Model 845 01454
 McDonnell F-4C Phantom II 64-0741
 McDonnell Douglas F-15B Eagle 73-0114
 McDonnell Douglas X-36
 McDonnell Douglas YC-15 72-1875
 McDonnell Douglas YF-4E Phantom II 65-0713
 McDonnell Douglas YF-15A Eagle 71-0287
 McDonnell F-101B Voodoo 58-288
 McDonnell NF-4C Phantom II 63-7407
 McDonnell RF-4C Phantom II 64-1004
 NASA M2-F1
 North American CT-39A Sabreliner 60-3505
 North American F-86F Sabre 52-5241
 North American F-100A Super Sabre 52-5760
 North American T-28B Trojan 137702
 North American X-15 – Replica
 North American YF-100A Super Sabre 52-5755
 Northrop F-89D Scorpion 52-1959
 Northrop T-38A Talon 61-0810
 Northrop T-38A Talon 61-0849
 Northrop X-4 Bantam 46-676
 Northrop X-21 55-408
 Northrop X-21 55-410
 Northrop YA-9A 71-1367
 Piasecki H-21B Work Horse 52-8623
 Piper PA-48 Enforcer 48-8301002
 Republic F-84F Thunderstreak 51-9350
 Republic F-105D Thunderchief 61-146
 Rockwell B-1B Lancer 84-0049
 Rutan VariEze
 Ryan AQM-34J Firebee
 Scaled Composites Model 133
 Scaled Composites Model 226
 Sikorsky CH-34G Seabat 53-4477
 Sikorsky JCH-3C 62-12581

Missiles 
 PGM-17 Thor

References

Footnotes

Notes

External links 
 

Air force museums in the United States
Aerospace museums in California
Military and war museums in California
Museums in Kern County, California